David Michael Bautista Jr. (born January 18, 1969) is an American actor and retired professional wrestler. He had several stints in WWE between 2002 and 2019. In his acting career, he is most widely known for his portrayal of Drax the Destroyer in the Marvel Cinematic Universe since Guardians of the Galaxy (2014).

Bautista began his wrestling career in 1999, and in 2000 signed with the then-World Wrestling Federation (WWF, renamed WWE in 2002). From 2002 to 2010, he gained fame under the ring name Batista and became a six-time world champion by winning the World Heavyweight Championship four times and the WWE Championship twice. His first reign with the World Heavyweight Championship is the longest reign for that title at 282 days. He has also held the World Tag Team Championship three times (twice with Ric Flair and once with John Cena) and the WWE Tag Team Championship once (with Rey Mysterio). He was the winner of the 2005 Royal Rumble match and went on to headline WrestleMania 21, one of the top five highest-grossing pay-per-view events in professional wrestling history. After leaving WWE in 2010, he re-signed in December 2013, making his first appearance back in January 2014 and won that year's Royal Rumble match. He headlined WrestleMania XXX before again departing that June. In October 2018, Bautista made his second return to WWE and faced Triple H at WrestleMania 35 in April 2019, before retiring from wrestling. Altogether Bautista won a total of eleven championships throughout his wrestling career.

Bautista began acting in 2006. He has starred in the films The Man with the Iron Fists (2012), Riddick (2013), Spectre (2015), Blade Runner 2049 (2017), Army of the Dead (2021), Dune (2021), and Glass Onion: A Knives Out Mystery (2022). He competed in his lone mixed martial arts fight on October 6, 2012, defeating Vince Lucero via first round technical knockout.

Early life 
Bautista was born in Washington, D.C., the son of Donna Raye (née Mullins) and hairdresser David Michael Bautista. His mother is of Greek descent, and his father is the son of Filipino immigrants. His paternal grandfather served in the Philippine military, worked as a taxi driver and barber, and held other jobs to feed the family. His mother is a lesbian. Bautista has said that he lived in poverty, and that he had a hard life—before he reached the age of nine, three murders had occurred on his front lawn. As young as age 13, he was stealing cars. By 17, he was estranged from his parents and living on his own. He later said, "I am proud of my parents. They are good, honest, hard-working folks. They taught me the values of working hard."

He was a nightclub bouncer until he was arrested after a fight that left two patrons injured, one of whom was rendered unconscious. After a trial, he was sentenced to one year of probation. He also worked as a lifeguard before pursuing a career in bodybuilding, which he credits with saving his life. He said he decided to turn his life around and become a wrestler after having a breakdown from the shame he felt after asking a coworker to lend him money so he could buy Christmas presents for his children.

Professional wrestling career

Training and early career (1999–2000)
Bautista tried out at the World Championship Wrestling (WCW) Power Plant, but was told he would never make it in the wrestling business by Sgt. Buddy Lee Parker. He then went to the World Wrestling Federation (WWF), who advised him to train with Afa Anoa'i in the Wild Samoan Training Center wrestling school, where he went to train and compete in Anoa'i's World Xtreme Wrestling (WXW) promotion. He had his debut match as Khan on October 30, 1999. Bautista also trained with Marrese Crump in Muay Thai and Eskrima. Most recently, he trained at Cesar Gracie Jiu-Jitsu under Cesar Gracie and has become a purple belt in Brazilian Jiu-Jitsu.

World Wrestling Federation/Entertainment/WWE

Ohio Valley Wrestling (2000–2002) 
Upon signing with the WWF in 2000, Bautista was sent to Ohio Valley Wrestling (OVW), a WWF developmental territory. He made his OVW debut later that year under the ring name Leviathan, where he immediately joined forces with Synn. As a member of the Disciples of Synn stable, he went undefeated until being beaten at Christmas Chaos by Kane with help from Stone Cold Steve Austin. He later won the OVW Heavyweight Championship from "The Machine" Doug Basham before losing the belt to The Prototype. A few months later, Bautista left OVW after he was promoted to WWE's main roster.

Early storylines (2002–2003) 
While still in OVW, Bautista began appearing on non-televised WWE events. He began his televised WWE career on May 9, 2002, on an episode of SmackDown! as Deacon Batista, a heel enforcer for Reverend D-Von. He made his WWE in-ring debut in a tag team match teaming with D-Von against Faarooq and Randy Orton, pinning Orton. Over several weeks, Orton tried to beat D-Von and Batista with different partners, but ultimately lost each time. Batista suffered his first loss in a match against Rikishi after D-Von accidentally punched him, allowing Rikishi to take advantage and pin Batista. Batista and D-Von argued over the forthcoming weeks, with Batista eventually turning on D-Von. On the November 14 episode of SmackDown!, Batista defeated D-Von to end their feud. After splitting with D-Von, he was assigned to the Raw brand and was renamed Batista. He aligned himself with Ric Flair and feuded with Kane, whom he defeated at Armageddon.

Evolution (2003–2005) 

In January 2003, Batista joined Triple H, Ric Flair and Randy Orton to form the heel stable Evolution. Batista, however, was sidelined for much of 2003 after he tore his right triceps muscle at a Raw live event in a tag team match alongside Orton against The Dudley Boyz. While training after the injury, Batista re-tore his triceps, extending his stay on the sidelines. Batista made his return on October 20 episode of Raw, interfering in a match between Goldberg and Shawn Michaels. At Armageddon, Batista and Ric Flair became the World Tag Team Champions. while Triple H won the World Heavyweight Championship and Randy Orton the Intercontinental Championship. Batista and Flair held the title until February 16, 2004, episode of Raw, when they were defeated by Booker T and Rob Van Dam. They later defeated Booker and Van Dam on the March 22 episode of Raw to regain the titles before losing them to Chris Benoit and Edge on the April 19 episode of Raw.

Since late 2004, the relationship between Batista and Triple H began to deteriorate in kayfabe. After a loss to Chris Jericho, Triple H verbally insulted Batista. Batista teased leaving Evolution that night, but declared that he was still part of Evolution and that they tricked everyone. Despite this ploy, Batista began behaving more like a face over the next few weeks in comparison to Evolution's heel tactics. One particular moment saw Batista express disgust as Triple H and Ric Flair boasted about how they had intimidated and/or beat up Jim Ross, Danny Hodge, and Stacy Keibler. Regardless, he continued to show his loyalty to Triple H and Evolution by running down to the ring and assisting them in matches.

As 2005 began, Triple H realized the possibility of Batista becoming a threat to his World Heavyweight Championship. Triple H suggested that he not enter the Royal Rumble, claiming that it would be selfish of him to do so, and to simply focus on Triple H retaining the title. Batista entered anyway and went on to win the Rumble earning the right to participate in the main event of WrestleMania 21 against the World Champion of his choice. In an attempt to persuade Batista to challenge WWE Champion John "Bradshaw" Layfield (JBL) and challenger John Cena in a triple-threat match rather than him, Triple H concocted a scheme to have Batista run over in a limousine resembling the one used by JBL. Initially, Batista did not want help from Evolution and wanted to confront JBL by himself. Triple H insisted that Evolution stick together and accompanied Batista anyway, saving him from the oncoming vehicle. Batista became aware of the plot while sneakily eavesdropping on fellow Evolution members and signed a contract guaranteeing him a match with the World Heavyweight Champion Triple H at WrestleMania 21, thus leaving Evolution and officially turning face. Batista initially pretended that he would sign with SmackDown!, giving Triple H and Flair the "thumbs up", but turned it into a "thumbs down" before attacking the pair. He emphasized his departure by powerbombing Triple H through the table used for the contract signing.

World Heavyweight Champion (2005–2008) 

Batista won the World Heavyweight Championship on April 3 in the main event of WrestleMania 21. WrestleMania 21 received 1.09 million pay-per-view buys worldwide – the then-highest ever number of buys for any non-boxing pay-per-view. Batista's match with Triple H was described by sports journalist Dave Meltzer as "the peak of one of [WWE's] best storylines in years". Batista won a rematch with Triple H for the World Heavyweight Championship at Backlash. After Batista retained his title against Edge on the May 23 episode of Raw, he was betrayed by Ric Flair, who helped Triple H viciously attack the champion as Triple H challenged Batista to a Hell in a Cell match at Vengeance. Batista won the match at Vengeance, retaining his title yet again. With this win, Batista became the first wrestler to pin Triple H in a Hell in a Cell match.

On the June 30 episode of SmackDown!, Batista was drafted to the SmackDown! brand as the last pick in the 2005 WWE Draft Lottery, making a surprise appearance to attack John "Bradshaw" Layfield (JBL), who was celebrating his victory in a six-man elimination match to crown the inaugural "SmackDown! Champion". JBL defeated Batista at The Great American Bash by disqualification after the referee saw Batista use a steel chair. They had a rematch at SummerSlam in a No Holds Barred match in which Batista pinned JBL. The feud culminated in a Texas Bull Rope match on the September 9 episode of SmackDown! with Batista retaining his championship. Soon after retaining the title in a feud with Eddie Guerrero at No Mercy, WWE.com reported that Batista suffered a muscle tear in his back at the taping for the November 11 episode of SmackDown! due to a double chokeslam from Big Show and Kane. Plans had been made for Batista to defend the title in a Triple Threat match with Eddie Guerrero and Randy Orton on the November 18 episode of SmackDown!, but the match did not take place due to the unexpected death of Guerrero on November 13, the date of the taping. Batista paid homage to Guerrero during the Raw and SmackDown! tribute shows dedicated to Guerrero's memory.

Batista led Team SmackDown! against Team Raw in an inter-brand feud before Survivor Series. The feud saw Big Show and Kane chokeslamming Batista several more times in the weeks leading up to Survivor Series in an on-camera explanation for Batista's injury. Batista ultimately helped his team win the match at Survivor Series. After Batista saved Rey Mysterio from Big Show and Kane on the December 2 episode of SmackDown!, leading to a match with Mysterio teaming with Batista to face Big Show and Kane at Armageddon.

On December 16 episode of SmackDown!, Batista and Mysterio defeated WWE Tag Team Champions MNM to win the titles in a match they dedicated to Eddie Guerrero, and thus Batista became a double champion. After this, the clash with Big Show and Kane at Armageddon turned into a Champions vs. Champions encounter. Batista and Mysterio lost to Big Show and Kane at Armageddon. Two weeks later on SmackDown!, MNM defeated Batista and Mysterio after help from the returning Mark Henry to regain the WWE Tag Team Championship. During the interference, Henry attacked Batista, and performed his World's Strongest Slam. The teams met again in a steel cage match the following week that Henry also became involved in, and Batista and Mysterio were defeated again. Batista tore his right triceps during a match with Mark Henry at a house show on January 6, forcing him to vacate the World Heavyweight Championship at the SmackDown! tapings on January 13, two days after surpassing Triple H's previous mark of 280 days for longest reigning champion. In his book, Batista Unleashed, Batista said that he believed that Henry was "careless" during their match as he never gave Batista any warning that the move was coming. Batista went on to have successful surgery on his arm on January 12.

Batista made an appearance at No Way Out and told the crowd that once his arm had healed he would return to regain the World Heavyweight Championship. At WrestleMania 22, he interrupted a Randy Orton interview, putting SmackDown! on notice that the World Heavyweight Championship would return to him by WrestleMania 23.

Batista made his official return during the July 7 episode of SmackDown! immediately calling out and entering into a feud with Mark Henry. At Saturday Night's Main Event XXXIII, Batista won a six-man tag match with teammates Rey Mysterio and Bobby Lashley, defeating World Heavyweight Champion King Booker, Finlay, and Mark Henry. Henry was legitimately injured and was ruled out of the scheduled match between the two at The Great American Bash, thus further delaying a potential feud between the two after being delayed by Batista's initial injury.

Batista put out an open challenge to replace the injured Henry, which was answered by Mr. Kennedy. At The Great American Bash, Batista lost this match via disqualification for failing to stop choking Mr. Kennedy into the turnbuckle with his boot, but continued to attack Kennedy resulting in a laceration on his forehead so severe that it exposed his cranium and required more than 20 stitches to close. Batista lost another match with Kennedy via count out in a rematch on the July 28 episode of SmackDown! before finally defeating Kennedy by pinfall on the August 4 episode of SmackDown!.

Batista faced Big Show for the ECW World Championship on the August 1 episode of ECW, winning the match by disqualification but failing to win the championship as titles cannot change hands by disqualification. He then set his sights on King Booker's World Heavyweight Championship, with the two facing in a match for the title at SummerSlam on August 20. However, Batista also won this match by disqualification. Batista continued his pursuit of the championship, failing to capture it once again in a fatal-four way at No Mercy in October also involving Finlay and Bobby Lashley, before finally defeating Booker to regain the World Heavyweight Championship at Survivor Series on November 26. The following month at Armageddon, Batista teamed with John Cena to defeat King Booker and Finlay, putting an end to the rivalry.

Going into 2007, Batista began a short feud with Mr. Kennedy over the championship. Batista retained the championship over Kennedy at the Royal Rumble on January 28. Batista's next challenger was The Undertaker, the winner of the Royal Rumble match. The two formed a reluctant alliance to face John Cena and Shawn Michaels at No Way Out in February, which they lost after Batista turned on Undertaker midway through the match. At WrestleMania 23 on April 1, Batista lost the World Heavyweight Championship to The Undertaker. They continued their feud with a Last Man Standing match at Backlash later that month, which ended in a draw. The two wrestled again in a Steel Cage Match on the May 11 episode of SmackDown!, which also ended in a draw. Following the match, Edge took advantage and won the title from The Undertaker by cashing in his Money in the Bank contract. Afterward, Batista challenged Edge unsuccessfully for the World Heavyweight Championship at Judgment Day, One Night Stand (in a Steel Cage Match), and Vengeance: Night of Champions (in a Last Chance match). The loss at Vengeance stipulated that Batista could no longer get another chance at the World Heavyweight Championship while Edge remained champion.

Batista accepted an open challenge from The Great Khali at The Great American Bash. Edge relinquished the title due to an injury the week before The Great American Bash, and Khali became the new World Heavyweight Champion, winning a Battle Royal and eliminating Batista. Batista and Kane, Edge's title opponent, faced Khali at The Great American Bash in a Triple Threat match where Khali retained the title. Batista received a disqualification victory against Khali at SummerSlam after Khali used a steel chair, thus Khali retained the title again. Batista finally claimed his third World Heavyweight Championship after eight consecutive attempts, by defeating Khali in a triple threat match that included Rey Mysterio at Unforgiven. His first challenge was from The Great Khali in a Punjabi Prison Match at No Mercy where Batista retained his title. He won the match by leaping from the inner bamboo structure to the outer one, shortening his escape route and beating Khali to the floor.

After the return of The Undertaker at Unforgiven, the duo reignited their feud at Cyber Sunday where the fans chose Stone Cold Steve Austin as the Special Guest Referee. Batista pinned The Undertaker after two Batista Bombs. The feud continued with a Hell in a Cell match at Survivor Series. During the match, Edge returned and interfered by giving The Undertaker a con-chair-to. He then pulled an unconscious Batista on top of The Undertaker for the pinfall to retain the World Heavyweight Championship. At Armageddon, Edge won a Triple Threat match, alongside The Undertaker for Batista's World Heavyweight Championship.

Batista appeared in the Royal Rumble and made the final three before being eliminated by Triple H. At No Way Out, he was part of the SmackDown Elimination Chamber Match and eliminated Big Daddy V, but was last eliminated by The Undertaker. At WrestleMania XXIV, he defeated Umaga in an interpromotional match. After Shawn Michaels defeated Ric Flair in a Career Threatening match (forcing Flair to retire) later that night, Batista began a feud with Michaels, calling him selfish and egotistical. The two faced off at Backlash with Chris Jericho as the special guest referee. Michaels won after faking a knee injury and performing Sweet Chin Music. Batista then defeated Michaels at One Night Stand in a stretcher match, thus ending their feud.

On the June 23 episode of Raw, Batista was drafted from SmackDown to the Raw brand during the 2008 WWE Draft. After failing to win the World Heavyweight Championship from Edge at Night of Champions, Batista attacked Edge the following night on Raw, allowing CM Punk to cash in his Money in the Bank contract on Edge. This set up a title match between Batista and Punk at The Great American Bash which ended in a double disqualification after Kane interfered and attacked both men. The following night on Raw, Batista and Punk had a rematch, Batista won by disqualification after he was attacked by JBL. As John Cena came to the ring to fight JBL, he inadvertently punched Batista as JBL ducked. This started a program between Cena and Batista leading up to SummerSlam, for which a match was made official by Raw general manager Mike Adamle. This was the first time a match between the two would occur as they had each been on separate brands since they both debuted in 2002. On the August 4 episode of Raw, Batista and Cena won the World Tag Team Championship from Cody Rhodes and Ted DiBiase, making Batista a three-time World Tag Team Champion. The next week on Raw, Batista and Cena lost the World Tag Team Championship back to Rhodes and DiBiase. After losing the titles, the two had to be separated by multiple officials. Batista defeated Cena at SummerSlam, legitimating injuring Cena's neck in the process. Batista then competed in the World Heavyweight Championship championship scramble match at Unforgiven and was eight seconds away from being a four-time world champion, but Chris Jericho snuck in and pinned Kane in the waning seconds. On October 26 at Cyber Sunday, Batista defeated Jericho for his fourth World Heavyweight Championship in a match in which Stone Cold Steve Austin was voted in as the special guest referee. Batista's reign, however, only lasted eight days when Jericho won the title back in a Steel Cage match on the 800th episode of Raw on November 3.

Batista then entered a feud with former Evolution partner, Randy Orton; at Survivor Series, Batista led a team of himself, CM Punk, Kofi Kingston, Matt Hardy, and R-Truth to face the team of Randy Orton, Shelton Benjamin, William Regal, Cody Rhodes, and Mark Henry. Orton's team won with Orton pinning Batista, winning the match for his team. His feud with Orton continued up to Armageddon where Batista defeated Orton. On the December 15 episode of Raw, Batista was put into a handicap match against The Legacy with John Cena as his partner. During the match, Orton struck Batista with a punt to the head. Batista was knocked out and put out of action indefinitely due to a storyline head injury. WWE.com later reported that Batista elected to undergo surgery to repair a hamstring tear. His hamstring was injured at SummerSlam, in the same match that John Cena was forced out of action with a neck injury. He was expected to be out of action for six to eight months.

WWE Champion (2009–2010) 
Batista returned on the Raw after WrestleMania 25, to save Triple H, Shane McMahon, and Vince McMahon from The Legacy (Randy Orton, Cody Rhodes and Ted DiBiase Jr.). Vince McMahon then scheduled Batista to team up with WWE Champion Triple H and Shane McMahon to face The Legacy at Backlash. During the match, Batista had brought out a chair, but Triple H tried to stop him, so they would not get disqualified (which would have cost Triple H the championship). This distraction, however, cost Triple H his championship, after he lost it to Orton. The following night on Raw, Batista won a singles match against Big Show due to a distraction by John Cena, to become the number one contender for the WWE Championship at Judgment Day, which he won by disqualification. Batista went on to defeat Orton in a rematch at Extreme Rules in a Steel Cage match to capture his first WWE Championship. However, on the June 8 episode of Raw, Batista was to vacate the title due to a staged brutal attack by Orton and the Legacy. It was later revealed that Batista had suffered a legitimate torn left biceps similar to what he suffered in 2006. Legacy was given on-screen credit for his injury.

Batista returned on the September 14 episode of Raw with his arm still in a vice. Randy Orton, assuming Batista was retiring, claimed that he ended Batista's career. Batista then removed his arm vice, which turned to be fake, and attacked Orton. He then stated that he would not retire, but move to SmackDown instead. Later that night, he defeated Orton in a no-holds barred match which was to be his last match on Raw.

Following his return to SmackDown, Batista defeated Unified WWE Tag Team Champions Jeri-Show (Chris Jericho and Big Show) in singles competition. These two victories culminated in a tag team title match against Jeri-Show with his partner Rey Mysterio on October 4 at Hell in a Cell, which Jeri-Show won. That same month at Bragging Rights, Batista was unsuccessful in winning the World Heavyweight Championship in a Fatal Four-Way match including CM Punk, Rey Mysterio, and champion The Undertaker. During the match, Mysterio broke up Batista's pin on Undertaker costing him the match and the title. After the match (which Undertaker won), Batista and Mysterio appeared to patch things up, but Batista said he was tired of coming so close only to be stabbed in the back and told Mysterio he was going to rip his head off. Batista proceeded to brutally attack Mysterio, turning heel for the first time since 2005. Batista faced Mysterio on November 22 at Survivor Series, where Batista won via referee stoppage after delivering three Batista Bombs to Mysterio. Batista defeated Mysterio again in a street fight on the December 11 episode of SmackDown. On December 13 at TLC: Tables, Ladders & Chairs, Batista faced Undertaker for the World Heavyweight Championship in a Chairs match. Batista initially won the match and the title, but SmackDown General Manager Theodore Long reversed the decision because Batista had hit Undertaker with a low blow behind the referee's back. The match was restarted with The Undertaker winning and retaining the championship. Five days later, Batista lost to Mysterio in a number one contenders match for the World Heavyweight Championship; Mysterio's title match against The Undertaker on the December 25 episode of SmackDown ended as a no-contest after interference from Batista.

At the Royal Rumble in January 2010, Batista entered the Royal Rumble match at number 30, but failed to win as he was eliminated by John Cena. Batista then became involved in WWE Chairman Vince McMahon and Bret Hart's rivalry by assisting McMahon in attacking Hart; John Cena attempted to save Hart, but was assaulted by Batista. On February 21 at Elimination Chamber, as payment for Batista attacking Hart, McMahon allowed Batista to face Cena for the WWE Championship immediately after Cena won the title in an Elimination Chamber match. Batista won the match and thus his second WWE Championship, which resulted in Batista moving back to Raw. On March 28 at WrestleMania XXVI, Batista lost the WWE Championship to John Cena in a rematch, ending his reign at 35 days. Batista received his rematch for the title in a Last Man Standing match on April 25 at Extreme Rules, but was defeated by Cena after Cena duct-taped his legs around a ring post, preventing him from standing up. Batista and Cena faced off once again for the WWE Championship on May 23 at Over the Limit, but he failed again to regain the title from Cena in an "I Quit" match, quitting as Cena threatened to give him the Attitude Adjustment off the roof of a car. Cena did so anyway, throwing Batista off of the car and through the stage below.

The following night on Raw, Batista opened the show in a wheelchair and claimed that he would be pursuing legal action against Cena and WWE for his injuries (which he revealed in 2014 to be a legitimate compression fracture of his L1 spine). His promo was interrupted by new Raw General Manager Bret Hart, who ordered he face an injured Randy Orton to qualify for a shot at WWE Championship against Cena again at the new Fatal 4-Way pay-per-view. Batista refused and quit the company after Hart named Orton winner by forfeit. His profile was subsequently moved to the alumni page on WWE's website. He later said in an interview that he left WWE because he "did not like the direction the company was going in".

Return to WWE (2014) 

Batista made his return to WWE on the January 20, 2014 episode of Raw. Despite returning as a face and winning the Royal Rumble, the live crowd reacted negatively towards Batista's win, as Daniel Bryan did not take part in the match. Despite a positive reaction originally, the crowd began to boo Batista after Roman Reigns was eliminated. After the show went off the air, Batista mocked Bryan and gestured his middle finger at the crowd. According to Batista, he thought a return as a face was a bad idea because of the fans being so invested in Daniel Bryan's "Yes Movement". At the Elimination Chamber event and on the February 24 episode of Raw, Batista was heavily booed by the fans during matches against Alberto Del Rio thus resulting in Batista turning heel on the February 28 episode of SmackDown. The main event of WrestleMania XXX, originally Batista versus Randy Orton for the WWE World Heavyweight Championship, was changed to a triple threat match after Bryan defeated Triple H at WrestleMania. At WrestleMania, Bryan forced him to submit to win the title.

The next night on Raw, Batista and Orton teamed together to face The Usos for the WWE Tag Team Championship, but the match ended in a double count out. Later that night, Batista and Orton, along with Kane, attacked Bryan before he was set to defend his title against Triple H. Before Triple H could defeat Bryan, The Shield interrupted by spearing Triple H and taking out Batista, Orton and Kane, causing the match to end in a no-contest. On the April 14 episode of Raw, Batista, Triple H and Randy Orton came down to the ring to attack The Shield after their 11-on-3 handicap match, using the name and the theme of Evolution. At both Extreme Rules and Payback, Evolution lost to The Shield. On the June 2 episode of Raw, Batista quit WWE after Triple H denied him a shot at the WWE World Heavyweight Championship. Batista legitimately quit the WWE due to creative differences soon after.

In April 2015, Batista said that he would be interested in returning to WWE, but only at non-televised events. He was contacted to appear at WrestleMania 32 in 2016, but turned down the offer. Regarding his brief tenure in professional wrestling, he said that his greatest achievement was "putting guys over" and "repaying favors".

Second return to WWE (2018–2019) 
On October 16, 2018, Batista reunited with the rest of Evolution for an appearance on SmackDowns 1000th episode, where Batista teased a match with Triple H, as Triple H had never beaten Batista in singles competition. The storyline between them started on February 25, 2019, when Batista attacked Ric Flair. At WrestleMania 35, Batista and Triple H face each other in a No Hold Barred with their careers on the line, where, Batista lost after interference from Ric Flair. The next day, Batista announced his retirement from professional wrestling.

On December 9, 2019, WWE officially announced that Batista would be inducted into the WWE Hall of Fame as a part of the Class of 2020. The event was postponed due to the COVID-19 pandemic and it was announced that the class of 2020 would be inducted alongside the class of 2021 at the 2021 event. Prior to the event, however, he was removed from the list. Batista posted to Twitter, confirming his removal, citing previous obligations as a reason for why he could not attend the 2021 event. He also said that WWE honored his request to induct him at a future ceremony.

Professional wrestling style and persona

Upon his return to WWE in 2014, Batista was heavily booed by the crowd after winning the Royal Rumble, despite playing a face character. In an interview with WWE.com, he said the crowd reaction "...was weird. It wasn't like a normal response. It was almost like a personal attack. It had to do with factors that were not in my control, factors and things that were going on in the company with other people, stuff that really had nothing to do with me. To me, it was a little frustrating, a little confusing, and, you know, I don’t want to say I completely took it personal, but I did somewhat." The fan reaction caused Batista to turn prematurely heel. He was declared as the 50th greatest wrestling villain of all time by a WWE article in 2012. WWE has also ranked him as the second best World Heavyweight Champion of all time.

WWE advertised the Batista character as being 6 feet 6 inches tall and weighing 290 pounds. (Both statistics are different from his actual height and weight as of August 2020.)

Mixed martial arts career
After leaving WWE, Bautista attended Strikeforce: Los Angeles, a mixed martial arts (MMA) event, on June 16, 2010, having previously registered an interest in competing in MMA. On June 21, 2010, Bautista stated that he would be embarking on an MMA career. He also became a purple belt in Brazilian jiu-jitsu under the tutelage of 
Cesar Gracie. Bautista and Strikeforce agreed on a price and were negotiating a contract. However, in April 2011, Bautista stated that negotiations fell through when the organization was bought by the Zuffa company.

Bautista was expected to make his MMA debut against Rashid Evans on October 6, 2012, at CES MMA: Real Pain in Providence, Rhode Island. However, on October 1, 2012, Evans was forced out of the bout after a probation violation landed him back in jail. Evans was replaced by journeyman and 40-fight veteran Vince Lucero. Bautista went on to win the fight by technical knockout (TKO) at 4:05 in the first round.

Mixed martial arts record 

|-
|Win
|align=center|1–0
|Vince Lucero
|TKO (punches)
|CES MMA: Real Pain
|
|align=center|1
|align=center|4:05
|Providence, Rhode Island, United States
| 
|-

Acting career 
Bautista has acted and guest-starred in several television shows as both himself and in-character as Batista. He guest-starred in the eighth episode of season 6 of the American drama action/adventure television series Smallville, where he played Aldar, an extraterrestrial alien who escaped from the Phantom Zone, who sucks the bones out of people for nourishment. In June 2009, he made a cameo appearance as himself on the Australian soap opera Neighbours. In 2010, he appeared in an episode of Chuck, and also made a cameo appearance in Relative Strangers. He worked alongside Rob Van Dam, Marrese Crump and Ja Rule on the 2010 action film Wrong Side of Town.

Bautista appeared as the villainous Brass Body in the Universal Studios film The Man with the Iron Fists. He played Drax the Destroyer in the 2014 Marvel Studios film Guardians of the Galaxy, which was a critical and commercial success. He played Mr. Hinx in the James Bond film Spectre (2015), and starred as the villain Tong Po in the reboot of the 1989 martial arts film Kickboxer, opposite Georges St-Pierre. He had a memorable supporting role near the beginning of the epic science fiction film Blade Runner 2049, released in 2017 to critical praise. He reprised his role as Drax in Guardians of the Galaxy Vol. 2 (released May 2017); Avengers: Infinity War (April 2018); and Avengers: Endgame (April 2019).

In 2018, Bautista joined his castmates in support of Guardians of the Galaxy director James Gunn after Gunn's firing over old tweets joking about pedophilia and rape. Bautista called Gunn's firing "nauseating", and declared that if Disney (parent company of Marvel Studios) did not use Gunn's script for Guardians of the Galaxy Vol. 3, he would ask to be recast. Gunn was reinstated as the film's director in March 2019. On May 24, 2021, during an appearance on The Ellen DeGeneres Show, Bautista confirmed that the upcoming Guardians of the Galaxy Vol. 3 would be his final appearance as the character.

Bautista starred in Zack Snyder's Army of the Dead (2021). He had a villainous role in Dune, a film adaptation of the novel of the same name by Frank Herbert, which was released to glowing reviews. He appeared in Glass Onion, the sequel to Knives Out (2019), playing 'Duke'. He is to set to star in the fantasy-adventure film In the Lost Lands with Milla Jovovich, directed by Paul W.S. Anderson. On December 6, 2021, he was cast in Knock At The Cabin, written and directed by M. Night Shyamalan.

Other media 

Bautista appeared on the covers of the April 2005 Flex, and Muscle & Fitness for September 2008. Along with John Cena and Ashley Massaro, he appeared representing WWE on an episode of Extreme Makeover: Home Edition in January 2007, giving the kids of the family whose house was renovated WWE merchandise and eight tickets to WrestleMania 23.

According to the Wrestling Figure Checklist, Bautista had 171 action figures released in the 2000s and 2010s; most were released in the mid-to-late 2000s by Jakks Pacific. He remarked on his 2007 appearance on MTV Cribs, "I was trying to collect my action figures, but I gave up, there became too many".

On October 16, 2007, his autobiography, Batista Unleashed, was released. In an interview about it, he claimed, "I didn't want to tell my story unless it was honest... You have to go through three sets of lawyers: Simon & Schuster lawyers, WWE lawyers, my lawyers. Everything now being the way it is, you can be sued for the simplest thing." There was controversy over the book's mention of Chris Benoit, a wrestler who killed his wife and strangled his son in a murder-suicide, and about whom other details were removed from the book. Bautista said, "I loved the guy. I despise what he did, but that doesn't erase him from my life. I fought to keep him in there and am glad they did."

When asked about his ex-wife, Angie, Bautista says, "[We] have really become close again, which we really haven't been in years. I really learned a lot about her, and she learned a lot about me from reading the book. She actually saw things from a different perspective from reading the book. So that was definitely therapeutic."

During the week of November 5, 2007, Bautista appeared on Family Feud with several other WWE wrestlers.

On September 7, 2008, he was a judge on an episode of Iron Chef America, with snails as the theme ingredient. Along with Candice Michelle, Shelton Benjamin, and Josh Mathews, he represented the WWE at the 2008 Democratic National Convention in an effort to persuade fans to register to vote in the 2008 presidential election. He has also appeared on MTV Cribs showing his house and cars. His first biographical DVD, Batista: I Walk Alone, was released through WWE Productions on October 20, 2009. A second DVD, WWE Batista: The Animal Unleashed (released June 2014) continued his life story, detailing his departure from WWE in 2010 and his return to it in 2014.

Personal life 

Bautista married his first wife, Glenda, in 1990. They had two daughters together, Keilani (born 1990) and Athena (born 1992), before they divorced in 1998. Bautista married his second wife, Angie, on October 13, 1998. They have a son together, Oliver, and divorced in 2006. Before the age of 40, Bautista already had two grandsons through Keilani. During his marriage to Angie, he became an avid collector of vintage metal lunchboxes. His favorite is the 1967 Green Hornet lunchbox, as it has Bruce Lee on it. The collection started when he bought Angie an E.T. lunchbox and she did not want to break it, so he bought a second one. In October 2015, he married competitive pole dancer Sarah Jade. They separated in early 2019.

He has numerous tattoos, including a large dragon on his back, red kanji lettering on his upper left biceps which says "Angel" (in tribute to Angie), a signature design on his upper right biceps, and a small sun on his abdomen which encircles his navel. He also has a tattoo on his arm of the flags of Greece and the Philippines. While taking time off due to injury in 2009, he had both upper arms covered in large, tribal style tattoos, and the phrase "DC soldier" added to his right biceps. He once had a tattoo of a meteor on his arm, a logo associated with former friend Manny Pacquiao, but had it covered up with a sugar skull design after Pacquiao made homophobic remarks.

A baseball fan, Bautista grew up following the New York Yankees, although he has since embraced the Washington Nationals, who play at Nationals Park blocks from Bautista's childhood home.

Bautista supported Bernie Sanders in the 2020 Democratic Party presidential primaries. He endorsed Joe Biden in the 2020 United States presidential election and appeared in an ad for his presidential campaign.

Controversies 
During a commercial shoot for the 2006 SummerSlam pay-per-view, Bautista got into a legitimate fistfight with Booker T. The incident was reported on WWE.com, with both men telling their sides of the story. Booker T believed that Bautista considered himself better than the rest of the roster due to his main-event status and relatively quick climb to achieve it. Wrestlers backstage praised Booker for speaking his mind to Bautista about his attitude.

In August 2007, ESPN included Bautista on a list they claimed were clients of Signature Pharmacy of Orlando, Florida, which was under investigation for illicitly selling anabolic steroids. Bautista denied the allegations, and said that he was "tested regularly by the WWE" and "in full compliance with the WWE Wellness Program".

Filmography

Film

Television

Video games

Theme park attractions

Championships and accomplishments

Professional wrestling 
 The Baltimore Sun
 Feud of the Year (2007) 
 Ohio Valley Wrestling
 OVW Heavyweight Championship (1 time)
 Pro Wrestling Illustrated
 Most Improved Wrestler of the Year (2005)
 Wrestler of the Year (2005)
 Ranked No. 1 of the top 500 singles wrestlers in the PWI 500 in 2005
Power Pro Wrestling
PPW Television Championship (1 time)
 World Wrestling Entertainment/WWE
 WWE Championship (2 times)
 World Heavyweight Championship (4 times)
 World Tag Team Championship (3 times) – with Ric Flair (2) and John Cena (1)
 WWE Tag Team Championship (1 time) – with Rey Mysterio
 Royal Rumble (2005, 2014)
 World Xtreme Wrestling
 Hall of Fame (2013)
 Wrestling Observer Newsletter
 Feud of the Year (2005) 
 Feud of the Year (2007) 
 Most Overrated (2006)

References

External links 

 
 
 

1969 births
21st-century American male actors
Living people
American collectors
American male actors of Filipino descent
American male film actors
American male mixed martial artists
Mixed martial artists utilizing wrestling
Mixed martial artists utilizing Brazilian jiu-jitsu
American male professional wrestlers
American people of Greek descent
American practitioners of Brazilian jiu-jitsu
American professional wrestlers of Filipino descent
Male actors from Tampa, Florida
Male actors from Washington, D.C.
People from Arlington County, Virginia
Professional wrestlers from Washington, D.C.
The Authority (professional wrestling) members
World Heavyweight Champions (WWE)
WWE Champions
21st-century professional wrestlers
OVW Heavyweight Champions